The Lindenwood Lions football program is a college football team that represents Lindenwood University. The team has had 5 head coaches since organized football began in 1990. The Lions have played in more than 300 games in its 25 seasons. In those seasons, two coaches have led the Lions to postseason bowl games: Dan Kratzer and, Patrick Ross. Ross is the only coach to have won a conference championship with the Lions, he has won three. Ross, has also won a postseason game with the Lions. Ross is the all-time leader in games coached and years coached, in wins, and winning percentage. Jeff Driskill is, in terms of winning percentage, the least successful coach the Lions have had as he has a .177 winning percentage.

Key

Coaches
Statistics correct as of the end of the 2022 NCAA Division II football season

Notes

References

Lindenwood
Missouri sports-related lists